Ken Barnes (born 27 December 1941) is a former  Australian rules footballer who played with South Melbourne in the Victorian Football League (VFL). He was recruited from Williamstown in 1964, after winning the Seconds best and fairest award in 1962. He returned to Williamstown during 1967 and played until the end of 1971, when he was captain after Max Papley stood out from playing for a season. He was vice-captain in 1969 and 1970. He played in the 1969 VFA Second Division premiership victory in 1969 over Sunshine and was in the losing 1968 Second Division loss to Geelong West. He also won the Club best and fairest award in 1969. He was selected as first ruck in the Williamstown 1960's Team of the Decade. He played a total of 96 games for the Seagulls and kicked 56 goals. He is the son of former South Melbourne and Williamstown player and State cricketer, Jack Barnes.

Notes

External links 

Living people
1941 births
Australian rules footballers from Victoria (Australia)
Sydney Swans players